("Magic Balloon") was a children's television program in Brazil that aired between 1983 and 1986. The children, who were the main stars of the program, were also part of a children's musical group, Turma do Balão Mágico ("The Magic Balloon Gang"), which was active between 1982 and 1986.

The show introduced the popular character Fofão.

Balão Mágico aired on Brazilian television network Rede Globo from 1983–1986. The show's success led to Fofão receiving a solo show after Balão Mágico ended in 1986.

Production
In 1982, realizing the success of the children's programs Bambalalão, by TV Cultura, and Bozo, by SBT, Rede Globo decided to create its own program aimed at children and with a circus theme, like the competitors, selecting the director Nilton Travesso to conceive the project. The director invited Simony, who was successful as a member of the children's group Turma do Balão Mágico, to present the program alongside Orival Pessini as the character Fofão, naming the attraction as Balão Mágico '. The program premiered on March 7, 1983 and included Castrinho as the clown Cascatinha and Simony's cousin, Luciana Benelli.

After three months, due to the public's estrangement, the broadcaster decided to include Mike and Tob in the presentation, the other two members of Turma do Balão Mágico, and, in 1984, Jairzinho joined the group and also on the program. In 1984 Tob left the group and was replaced by Ricardinho, who also joined the program instead.

As a result, the broadcaster decided to put an end to the program, but as the Xou da Xuxa would debut only in June at the time, the attraction started to be presented in those three months only by Ticiane Pinheiro, who vineyard of the very successful TV Criança in Band.

Cast
The show's main cast comprised:
 Simony (Simony Benelli Galasso): The only girl in the band
 Tob (Vimerson Canavilas Benedicto): The oldest member of the group
 Mike (Michael Biggs): Son of infamous British robber Ronnie Biggs
 Jairzinho (Jair Oliveira): Son of Brazilian musician Jair Rodrigues
 Ricardinho (Ricardo Batista): The last member of the group

References

External links

1983 Brazilian television series debuts
1986 Brazilian television series endings
Musical television series
Rede Globo original programming
Brazilian children's television series
Brazilian television series
1980s Brazilian television series
Brazilian music television series
Television series based on singers and musicians